Alexander Horwath (born March 27, 1987) is a retired American soccer player who played as a goalkeeper.

Career

College and Amateur
Horwath began his youth career with D.C. United, remaining with the youth squad from 2001 to 2003. In 2005, he attended college at the University of Connecticut but did not play due to an injury. In 2007, he transferred to the University of Wisconsin. While with Wisconsin, Horwath  established himself as his team's starting goalkeeper, appearing in 52 matches in his three years.

Horwath played in the USL Premier Development League during his collegiate career. In 2008, he played for the Northern Virginia Royals and in 2009 with Kansas City Brass. He also played with the Madison 56ers of the National Premier Soccer League in 2007.

Professional
At the conclusion of his college career, Horwath trained with Kansas City Wizards and was signed by Major League Soccer in April 2010 serving as the league pool goalkeeper to help teams during a goalkeeper emergency. During August 2010 he joined San Jose Earthquakes to replace the injured Joe Cannon. After remaining with San Jose for a few weeks, in October 2010 he joined Seattle Sounders and remained with the club until the end of the season.

During the 2011 Major League Soccer offseason Horwath went on trial with New York Red Bulls. On March 25, 2011, it was announced that Horwath had agreed to terms with New York. One day later Horwath made his official debut for New York starting in place of the injured Greg Sutton and Bouna Coundoul who was on international duty, helping his club to a 0–0 draw against Columbus Crew.

Horwath was waived by New York on November 23, 2011.

Horwath spent two years playing in the USL Pro, playing with the Wilmington Hammerheads in 2012 and VSI Tampa Bay FC in 2013. After initially signing with the Rochester Rhinos for 2014, Horwath instead joined Ljungskile SK in the second division of Sweden.

On January 9, 2015, he signed for Norwegian side SK Brann, after spending some days there undergoing tests and trials.

Horwath made his debut for SK Brann on April 6, 2015, against Fredrikstad FK, saving a 65th-minute penalty kick from Steffen Nystrøm in a match that ended 1–1. Horwath went on to make 8 appearances for SK Brann in the 2015 season which culminated with Brann gaining promotion to the 2016 Tippeligaen.

Horwath started the 2016 season as SK Branns second choice goalkeeper, behind Piotr Leciejewski in the pecking order. He ended up starting four games during the season, including SK Branns infamous loss to Førde IL in the first round of Norwegian football cup. SK Brann ended the season as runners-up behind Rosenborg BK.

The 2017 season started similarly as the last for Horwath, with Leciejewski being favored in goal for SK Brann. Horwath was used as the "cup keeper", and started all four games SK Brann played in the 2017 Norwegian Football Cup before they lost to Mjøndalen IF on August 9, 2017. Horwath also played the second leg of SK Branns Europa League Second Round Qualifier match against MFK Ružomberok.

Horwath returned to the United States in February 2018 when he signed with MLS club Real Salt Lake.

On November 21, 2019, it was announced that Horwath had retired from playing professional soccer.

International
Horwath played with the United States U-17 and United States U-19 national team.

References

External links
Wisconsin Badgers Profile

1987 births
Living people
Soccer players from Maryland
Sportspeople from the Baltimore metropolitan area
American expatriate soccer players
Wisconsin Badgers men's soccer players
Northern Virginia Royals players
Kansas City Brass players
New York Red Bulls players
Wilmington Hammerheads FC players
VSI Tampa Bay FC players
Ljungskile SK players
SK Brann players
Real Salt Lake players
Real Monarchs players
USL League Two players
Major League Soccer players
USL Championship players
Superettan players
Eliteserien players
People from Woodbine, Maryland
Expatriate footballers in Sweden
Expatriate footballers in Norway
American expatriate sportspeople in Sweden
American expatriate sportspeople in Norway
American soccer players
Association football goalkeepers
National Premier Soccer League players